Born rigidity is a concept in special relativity. It is one answer to the question of what, in special relativity, corresponds to the rigid body of non-relativistic classical mechanics.

The concept was introduced by Max Born (1909), who gave a detailed description of the case of constant proper acceleration which he called hyperbolic motion. When subsequent authors such as Paul Ehrenfest (1909) tried to incorporate rotational motions as well, it became clear that Born rigidity is a very restrictive sense of rigidity, leading to the Herglotz–Noether theorem, according to which there are severe restrictions on rotational Born rigid motions. It was formulated by Gustav Herglotz (1909, who classified all forms of rotational motions) and in a less general way by Fritz Noether (1909). As a result, Born (1910) and others gave alternative, less restrictive definitions of rigidity.

Definition

Born rigidity is satisfied if the orthogonal spacetime distance between infinitesimally separated curves or worldlines is constant, or equivalently, if the length of the rigid body in momentary co-moving inertial frames measured by standard measuring rods (i.e. the proper length) is constant and is therefore subjected to Lorentz contraction in relatively moving frames. Born rigidity is a constraint on the motion of an extended body, achieved by careful application of forces to different parts of the body. A body rigid in itself would violate special relativity, as its speed of sound would be infinite.

A classification of all possible Born rigid motions can be obtained using the Herglotz–Noether theorem. This theorem states, that all irrotational Born rigid motions (class A) consist of hyperplanes rigidly moving through spacetime, while any rotational Born rigid motion (class B) must be isometric Killing motions. This implies that a Born rigid body only has three degrees of freedom. Thus a body can be brought in a Born rigid way from rest into any translational motion, but it cannot be brought in a Born rigid way from rest into rotational motion.

Stresses and Born rigidity

It was shown by Herglotz (1911), that a relativistic theory of elasticity can be based on the assumption, that stresses arise when the condition of Born rigidity is broken.

An example of breaking Born rigidity is the Ehrenfest paradox: Even though the state of uniform circular motion of a body is among the allowed Born rigid motions of class B, a body cannot be brought from any other state of motion into uniform circular motion without breaking the condition of Born rigidity during the phase in which the body undergoes various accelerations. But if this phase is over and the centripetal acceleration becomes constant, the body can be uniformly rotating in agreement with Born rigidity. Likewise, if it is now in uniform circular motion, this state cannot be changed without again breaking the Born rigidity of the body.

Another example is Bell's spaceship paradox: If the endpoints of a body are accelerated with constant proper accelerations in rectilinear direction, then the leading endpoint must have a lower proper acceleration in order to leave the proper length constant so that Born rigidity is satisfied. It will also exhibit an increasing Lorentz contraction in an external inertial frame, that is, in the external frame the endpoints of the body are not accelerating simultaneously. However, if a different acceleration profile is chosen by which the endpoints of the body are simultaneously accelerated with same proper acceleration as seen in the external inertial frame, its Born rigidity will be broken, because constant length in the external frame implies increasing proper length in a comoving frame due to relativity of simultaneity. In this case, a fragile thread spanned between two rockets will experience stresses (which are called Herglotz–Dewan–Beran stresses) and will consequently break.

Born rigid motions

A classification of allowed, in particular rotational, Born rigid motions in flat Minkowski spacetime was given by Herglotz, which was also studied by Friedrich Kottler (1912, 1914), Georges Lemaître (1924), Adriaan Fokker (1940), George Salzmann & Abraham H. Taub (1954). The resulting worldliness can be split into two classes:

Class A: Irrotational motions

Herglotz defined this class in terms of equidistant curves which are the orthogonal trajectories of a family of hyperplanes, which also can be seen as solutions of a Riccati equation (this was called "plane motion" by Salzmann & Taub or "irrotational rigid motion" by Boyer). He concluded, that the motion of such a body is completely determined by the motion of one of its points.

The general metric for these irrotational motions has been given by Herglotz, whose work was summarized with simplified notation by Lemaître (1924). Also the Fermi metric in the form given by Christian Møller (1952) for rigid frames with arbitrary motion of the origin was identified as the "most general metric for irrotational rigid motion in special relativity". In general, it was shown that irrotational Born motion corresponds to those Fermi congruences of which any worldline can be used as baseline (homogeneous Fermi congruence).

The special case of translational motion with constant proper acceleration is known as hyperbolic motion, with the worldline

Class B: Rotational isometric motions

Herglotz defined this class in terms of equidistant curves which are the trajectories of a one-parameter motion group (this was called "group motion" by Salzmann & Taub and was identified with isometric Killing motion by Felix Pirani & Gareth Williams (1962)). He pointed out that they consist of worldlines whose three curvatures are constant (known as curvature, torsion and hypertorsion), forming a helix. Worldlines of constant curvatures in flat spacetime were also studied by Kottler (1912), Petrův (1964), John Lighton Synge (1967, who called them timelike helices in flat spacetime), or Letaw (1981, who called them stationary worldlines) as the solutions of the Frenet–Serret formulas.

General relativity

Attempts to extend the concept of Born rigidity to general relativity have been made by Salzmann & Taub (1954), C. Beresford Rayner (1959), Pirani & Williams (1962), Robert H. Boyer (1964). It was shown that the Herglotz–Noether theorem is not completely satisfied, because rigid rotating frames or congruences are possible which do not represent isometric Killing motions.

Alternatives

Several weaker substitutes have also been proposed as rigidity conditions, such as by Noether (1909) or Born (1910) himself.

A modern alternative was given by Epp, Mann & McGrath. In contrast to the ordinary Born rigid congruence consisting of the "history of a spatial volume-filling set of points", they recover the six degrees of freedom of classical mechanics by using a quasilocal rigid frame by defining a congruence in terms of the "history of the set of points on the surface bounding a spatial volume".

References

Bibliography

; English translation by David Delphenich: On the mechanics of deformable bodies from the standpoint of relativity theory.

 
In English:

External links

Born Rigidity, Acceleration, and Inertia at mathpages.com
The Rigid Rotating Disk in Relativity in the USENET Physics FAQ

Special relativity
Rigid bodies
Max Born